El Refugio ("The Refuge") is a city in the Tijuana municipality of Baja California, Mexico. The city had a population of 36,400 as of 2010.

See also

References

External links

Populated places in Tijuana Municipality